Kimiko Suzuki (1929–1992) was a Japanese architect. She is the first graduate at Japan Women's University with a degree in the housing studies program.

The time when Suzuki graduated is economic downturn following World War II. Instead of starting her career at an architecture firm, she had her first job in a publishing company and was promised the same salary as man. Suzuki was able to find a position in an architecture office after her marriage. She later became an independent architect and work on projects included residential designs, a kindergarten, and a medical clinic. She designed the Susume Abe's residence in 1967. Abe is known as a critic of Japanese education system. Suzuki died at 63 because of illness. A small collection of her works are collected at International Archive of Women in Architecture at Newman Library, Virginia Tech.

References 

1929 births
1992 deaths
20th-century Japanese architects